Bottom may refer to:

Anatomy and sex 
 Bottom (BDSM), the partner in a BDSM who takes the passive, receiving, or obedient role, to that of the top or dominant
 Bottom (sex), a term used by gay couples and BDSM
 Buttocks or bottom, part of the anatomy on the posterior of the pelvic region of apes and humans, and many other bipeds or quadrupeds

Arts, entertainment, and media 
 Bottom (TV series), a British sitcom and stage show
 "Bottom", a song by Puddle of Mudd from Life On Display
 "Bottom", a song by Tool from Undertow
 Nick Bottom, a character from Shakespeare's A Midsummer Night's Dream
 The Bottoms (novel), a 2000 novel by Joe R. Lansdale
 Bottoms, a 1966 film by Yoko Ono

Geography 
 Bottom (valley), the floor of a valley
 List of geographical bottoms, list of geographical features called "bottom"
 Bottomland (freshwater ecology), low-lying alluvial land adjacent to a river
Foggy Bottom, a neighborhood in Washington, D.C.
 Lower Bottoms, Oakland, California or The Bottoms, a neighborhood in Oakland, California, U.S.
 St. Paul's Bottoms or The Bottoms, a neighborhood in Shreveport, Louisiana
 Seabed, the floor of the ocean or ocean bottom
 Stream bed, the channel bottom of a stream, river or creek
 The Bottom, capital of the island of Saba
The Bottom (neighborhood in Dallas, Texas), a neighborhood in the Tenth Street Freedman's Town, Dallas, Texas, U.S.
 The Bottoms, an area in Franklinton (Columbus, Ohio), United States

Mathematics 
 Bottom, or falsum, a contradiction in logic and Boolean algebra
 Bottom element, in lattice theory and related branches of mathematics
 Bottom type, in type theory (the bottom element in the subtype relation)
 The symbol up tack (⊥), used to represent these concepts

People
 Bottom (surname), people with the surname Bottom
 Bottoms (surname), people with the surname Bottoms

Other uses
 Bottom (technical analysis), a chart pattern in the technical analysis of securities
Bottom quark, a subatomic particle
Trousers, Shorts and other "bottom wear", pieces of clothing to cover the lower portion of the body, particularly the legs.

See also
Bott
Bottoming (disambiguation)
Bottomry